Motshidisi Agnes Koloi, also spelled Motshidise, is a South African politician and educator who is currently serving as the Member of the Executive Council (MEC) for Social Development in the Free State provincial  government. Before that, she was MEC for Public Works and Human Settlements. She has served in the Free State Provincial Legislature as an ANC representative since May 2019. Prior to her election to the Provincial Legislature, Koloi had served as the executive mayor of the Moqhaka Local Municipality.

Background
Koloi holds a primary teacher's diploma and a diploma in education management. She proceeded to work as an educator before becoming active in politics. Koloi was a councillor for the African National Congress on the municipal council of the Moqhaka Local Municipality. She gradually rose in the municipal leadership ranks, going from part-time councillor to chief whip of the council before becoming the executive mayor of the municipality. As mayor of Moqhaka, she was elected as one of three deputy provincial chairpersons of the South African Local Government Association in November 2016.

Provincial government
Koloi was elected to the Free State Provincial Legislature in the 2019 general election as one of 19 ANC representatives. Shortly afterwards, re-elected premier Sisi Ntombela announced her new executive council for the sixth administration wherein Koloi was appointed as the Member of the Executive Council for Public Works and Human Settlements, succeeding Dorah Kotzee, who left the provincial legislature.

In May 2021, Koloi was appointed to serve on the Interim Provincial Executive Committee of the ANC after the 2018 Free State ANC provincial elective conference where the previous PEC was elected, was declared unlawful by the Supreme Court of Appeal.

Following Mxolisi Dukwana's election as Premier of the Free State, he moved Koloi to the Social Development portfolio of the executive council.

References

External links

Living people
Year of birth missing (living people)
Sotho people
South African educators
African National Congress politicians
Members of the Free State Provincial Legislature
21st-century South African politicians
21st-century South African women politicians
Women members of provincial legislatures of South Africa
Mayors of places in South Africa